Tian Ye or Ye Tian is a Chinese mathematician known for his research in number theory and arithmetic geometry.

Career
Tian received his PhD in mathematics under Shou-Wu Zhang at Columbia University in 2003 and is currently a professor at the Chinese Academy of Sciences.

He received of the ICTP Ramanujan Prize (2013) and the Morningside Medal (Silver 2007, Gold 2013).

Selected publications
.
.
.

References

Chinese mathematicians
Year of birth missing (living people)
Living people
Sichuan University alumni
University of Science and Technology of China alumni
Columbia Graduate School of Arts and Sciences alumni
Arithmetic geometers